List of notable events prior to the 2020 Singaporean general election:

New candidates/Outgoing MPs

New candidates

The following is a list of candidates contesting in the election for the first time. There are 73 new candidates. 

Candidates running as independents do not have a party logo but have a different logo reflected in the party column.

Outgoing Members of Parliament 

The following members of parliament (MPs) retired and did not seek re-election this time.

Pre-nomination day
The following is a list of events that occurred prior to Nomination Day on 30 June 2020. All times are reflected in Singapore Standard Time (SGT).

Pre-polling day
The following is a list of events that occurred from nomination day (30 June 2020) until the eve of polling day on 10 July 2020. All times below are reflected in Singapore Standard Time (SGT). Similar to previous elections since 2011, candidates begin campaigning from the end of nominations day until two days before polling day. The eve of polling day and after the last day for the campaigning period is cooling-off day, during this time in which campaigning is prohibited except for party political broadcasts.

Online e-rallies 
In this election, e-rallies served as replacements to physical rallies, which were unavailable due to precautionary measures from the ongoing COVID-19 pandemic. The contesting parties have taken to various social media platforms such as Facebook, YouTube, and Instagram, as well as media outlets like Singapore Press Holdings’ Chinese Media Group to deliver speeches, hold discussions and engage with voters. On 30 June, the ELD announced that ten different venues in Suntec Convention Centre would be made available daily for campaigning and live-streaming online rallies; applications to reserve one of the venues opened on Nomination Day after nominations had closed.

Political debate 
Debates were live telecast on 1 July 2020. Two round table debates each airing for an hour were held with a moderator on the current issues in Singapore, broadcast in English at 8 pm on Channel 5 and CNA938, and at 9 pm in Chinese on Channel 8 and Capital 95.8FM. A rerun of the English broadcast was broadcast at 9 pm on CNA. The candidates that participated in the debate were:

Party political broadcasts 
Similar to previous elections since 1980, parties who field at least six candidates for the election are eligible for participating in the party broadcast, with the allocated time depending on the number of participating candidates. The order of appearance is based on the number of candidates starting from the lowest.

Note: Jeyaretnam recorded his speech in a hotel instead of at the studio while he was still serving his mandatory 14-day Stay Home Notice.

Constituency Political Broadcasts 
In a historic first for elections, a new Constituency Political broadcast will be held between 3 and 8 July on 7 pm every evening during the campaigning period. The allotted time for broadcast is three-minutes per candidate. The broadcasts are pre-recorded. The order of appearance begin with incumbent parties followed by opposing parties, and constituencies are ordered based on alphabetical order, with one GRC or two SMCs in one segment.

References

2020 Singaporean general election
2020